Kép station is a railway station in Vietnam. It serves the town of Kép, in Bắc Giang Province. There is also a branch line to Hạ Long.

References

Buildings and structures in Bắc Giang province
Railway stations in Vietnam